Mega Hits is a Portuguese radio station and part of the r/com Group of the Portuguese Catholic Church. Established in 1998 and named Mega FM, it was renamed Mega Hits in 2009 due to a nationwide expansion. The station caters to the youth demographic.

Mega Hits mainly broadcasts dance music, pop music and rock.

Frequencies 

 Lisbon – 92.4 FM
 Porto – 90.6 FM
 Coimbra – 90.0 FM
 Sintra – 88.0 FM
 Aveiro – 96.5 FM
 Braga – 92.9 FM
Rio Maior – 92.6 FM
Viseu – 106.4 FM

Schedule 

 Snooze: Maria Correia Conguito and Mafalda Castro (6 AM-10 AM)
 Teresa Oliveira (10 AM-2 PM)
 Diogo Pires (2 PM-5 PM)
Drive In: Catarina Palma and Inês Andrade (5 PM-8 PM)
 Ana Pinheiro (8 PM-11 PM)
 Hot n' Slow (11 PM-Midnight)
Fresh: Nelson Cunha (Fridays, 8 PM-9 PM)
The Listening: Teresa Oliveira (Saturdays, 1 PM-2 PM)
Top 10 às 10: Diogo Pires (Sundays, 10 AM - 12 PM)
Mega Hits TikTok Radioshow: Maria Correia (Sundays, 12 PM - 2 PM)

Broadcasters 

 Maria Correia
 Teresa Oliveira
 Catarina Palma
 Ana Pinheiro
 Mafalda Castro
 Luís Pinheiro
 Inês Nogueira
 Conguito (Fábio Lopes)
 Alexandre Guimarães
 Diogo Pires
 Inês Andrade
Nelson Cunha

References

External links
Official website 
Wikipedia page (in Portuguese)

Radio stations in Portugal
Catholicism in Portugal
Christian radio stations in Europe
Catholic radio stations
1998 establishments in Portugal
Radio stations established in 1998